Rockingham ministry may refer to:

 First Rockingham ministry, the British government led by Lord Rockingham from 1765 to 1766
 Second Rockingham ministry, the British government led by Lord Rockingham from March to July 1782